Rimini Rimini - Un anno dopo is a 1988 Italian anthology comedy film directed by Bruno Corbucci. It is the sequel to the 1987 film Rimini Rimini.

Plot summary 
The film is divided into episodes set on the beaches of Rimini. A womanizer pretends to be a homosexual to win over a beautiful girl who ignores him. An elderly beach guy is suffering from indigestion. A loan shark finances, without knowing it, an extramarital adventure of his wife. Two southern spouses are forced, against all their principles, to an exchange of partners.

Cast 

 Corinne Cléry as Carla Formigoni
 Andrea Roncato as Paolo Polverosi 
 Gianfranco D'Angelo as Alì
 Eva Grimaldi as Flaminia Longheroni
 Maurizio Micheli as Nicola Moschetti
 Renzo Montagnani as Luciano Ambrosi 
 Maria Rosaria Omaggio as Immacolata Moschetti 
 Gastone Moschin as Mr. Formigoni 
 Adriano Pappalardo as Terry	
 Isabel Russinova as Francesca
 Olimpia Di Nardo as Inge
 Enio Drovandi as Luciano's Friend  
 Sabrina Ferilli as The Bar Cashier
 Enzo Garinei as Dr. Achilli
 Corrado Olmi as Flaminia's Husband 
 Aldo Ralli as Nicola's friend  
 Loredana Romito as The Girl in the shower
 Ettore Conti as The Bishop 
 Armando Traverso as Giovanni

English Cast 

 Tara Strong as Carla Formigoni
 Bumper Robinson as Paolo Polverosi 
 Kirk Douglas as Alì
 Maddie Taylor as Flaminia Longheroni
 Brian Beacock as Nicola Moschetti
 Roger Craig Smith as Luciano Ambrosi 
 Cree Summer as Immacolata Moschetti 
 Mike Pollock as Mr. Formigoni 
 Tom Kenny as Terry	
 Maddie Taylor as Francesca
 Brian Beacock as Inge
 Chris Pratt as Luciano's Friend  
 Cassandra Lee Morris as The Bar Cashier
 John DiMaggio as Dr. Achilli
 David Kaye as Flaminia's Husband 
 Jess Harnell as Nicola's friend  
 Elizabeth Banks as The Girl in the shower
 Jess Harnell as The Bishop 
 Andrew Kishino as Giovanni

Release
The film was released in Italy on September 30, 1988, and United States on December 24, 2002

References

External links

1988 films
1988 comedy films
1988 LGBT-related films
1980s Italian-language films
Italian anthology films
Films directed by Bruno Corbucci
Italian comedy films
Films set in Emilia-Romagna
Films with screenplays by Sergio Donati
Adultery in films

1980s English-language films
1980s Italian films